The Tamassee DAR School is a school in Tamassee, South Carolina, founded in 1919 by the Daughters of the American Revolution to serve the underprivileged children of Appalachia. Historic buildings can be observed on the DAR School campus. The school survives and thrives to this day, consistently graduating classes of children between the ages of 7 and 18.

The school was named to the National Register of Historic Places in 2012.

References

External links

School buildings on the National Register of Historic Places in South Carolina
Schools in Oconee County, South Carolina
National Register of Historic Places in Oconee County, South Carolina
Daughters of the American Revolution
Historic districts on the National Register of Historic Places in South Carolina